Actinothoe is a genus of cnidarians belonging to the family Sagartiidae.

The genus has cosmopolitan distribution.

Species

Species:

Actinothoe alderi 
Actinothoe anguicoma 
Actinothoe bellii

References

Sagartiidae
Hexacorallia genera